Line 3: Central ↔ Santos Dumont is a LRT line on VLT Carioca system, located in Rio de Janeiro, Brazil.

It has 10 stops, all at-grade, 6 of them connected with Line 1 (including terminal station Santos Dumont), 1 with Line 2 (terminal station Central), and 3 more for Line 3: Santa Rita/Pretos Novos, Camerino/Rosas Negras and Cristiano Ottoni/Pequena África.

The name of the stops of the line was changed to pay tribute to African descent movements and historical monuments connected to the African culture along the way, besides having only geographic references. Cristiano Ottoni/Pequena África was named after the square where the station is located and the area in the district of Centro, where are located the main locations for appreciation to the African culture and heritage. Camerino/Rosas Negras was named after Rua Camerino and the women movements against the slavery and in favor of the black people rights in the end of the 19th century and beginning of 20th century. Santa Rita/Pretos Novos was named after the cemetery located in the area, discovered during the line construction.

The line is in tests since November 2018, but problems between Rio's Prefecture and the LRT operating consortium didn't allow the line to enter in operation. It was opened on 26 October 2019.`

Station

Central → Santos Dumont

Santos Dumont → Central

References

Tram transport in Brazil
Railway lines opened in 2019